Jon Mersinaj (born 8 February 1999) is an Albanian professional footballer who plays as a defender for Croatian club Lokomotiva in the Croatian First Football League.

International career
Mersinaj debuted with the senior Albania national team in a friendly 0–0 tie with Estonia on 13 June 2022.

Career statistics

Club 

 As of match played 21 August 2021

References

External links
 Profile - FSHF

1999 births
Living people
Footballers from Tirana
Albanian footballers
Albania international footballers
Albania under-21 international footballers
Association football central defenders
NK Lokomotiva Zagreb players
KF Laçi players
Croatian Football League players
Kategoria Superiore players
Albanian expatriate footballers
Expatriate footballers in Croatia
Albanian expatriate sportspeople in Croatia